Clara Dobokai (before 1330 – after 1370) was the second wife of Nicholas Alexander, Voivode of Wallachia.

Origins 
Clara was the daughter of a Hungarian nobleman, John Dobokai, whose domains were located in Transylvania. Her mother's name and family are unknown. Clara's father was present at a trial in 1312, showing that he was of age at that time. Clara was most probably born in the 1310s or 1320s, according to historian Mihai Florin Hasan. Hasan says that she was given in marriage to Nicholas Alexander of Wallachia in the early 1340s.

Wife of Nicholas Alexandru 
Nicholas Alexandru was the son of Basarab, the first independent ruler of Wallachia. Clara and Nicholas Alexandru had three children: 
 Anna married to tsar Ivan Stracimir, Bulgarian ruler of Vidin Tsardom, and mother of Konstantin II Asen and Dorothea, Queen of Bosnia
 Voievode Radu I of Wallachia, succeeded his half brother Vladislav as voievode
 Anka Basaraba, married to Serbian Tsar Stefan Uros V, son of Stefan Dusan and Elena of Bulgaria

References

Sources 
 

House of Basarab
14th-century Hungarian women
14th-century Hungarian people
Royal consorts of Wallachia
Clara